E260 may refer to :
 The E number for acetic acid, the key constituent of vinegar
 Sansa e260, a flash memory–based digital audio player
 A model of the Mercedes-Benz W124 automobile manufactured 1986–1993